The Kingdom of Banggai was a petty kingdom in present-day Central Sulawesi, Indonesia. It was based around the Banggai Islands and the eastern coast of Sulawesi, centered at the island of Banggai. For a significant part of its history, the kingdom was under the overlordship of the Sultanate of Ternate.

History

Ternate
The island of Banggai was named in a Chinese document dating from 1304 and the 14th century Negarakertagama as a Majapahit tributary. In the 16th century, four small states located in Banggai were conquered by the Sultanate of Ternate under Sultan Babullah, with Java-born Ternatean general Adi Cokro expanding the polity in the 1580s to include parts of mainland Sulawesi. Adi Cokro's son Mandapar was recorded to rule between 1600 and 1625. It was recorded that the king of Banggai sent his son to Ternate in 1564 to examine Christianity and Islam, eventually selecting the former.

Between 1536 and 1539, Portuguese administrator António Galvão recorded contemporary oral tales of the kings of Banggai, along with Bacan, Papua, and Butung, being descended from hatchlings of four serpent eggs found by an elder in Bacan. The myth associated the states with the Maluku Islands – centered around Ternate and Tidore – placing them in the peripheries. A Dutch report from 1682 noted the Banggai Kingdom as having control over the relatively large islands of Banggai and Peleng, "a hundred" little islands – mostly uninhabited – in addition to parts of Southeast Sulawesi such as Balantak. Inhabitants of Peleng were subjected to slavery. Banggai also had dependencies in the eastern parts of Sulawesi's East Peninsula.

During this time, the island of Banggai was central to trade in foodstuffs in the area. Another Dutch figure from 1679 gave the kingdom's population as "10,000 able-bodied men", mostly non-Muslims. A later estimate from 1706 noted that some 90 percent of the population lived in Peleng – the total population estimate being as high as 21,560.  
During this time, Banggai was located between the powerful states of Ternate and Gowa, though Banggai later came under influence of Ternate following the Treaty of Bongaya in 1667, with Ternate receiving annual tribute from Banggai and appointing its ruler. During the late 17th and early 18th centuries, the Dutch East India Company attempted to spread its influence to Banggai with little success. During this time, Banggai was also subjected to raids from Papuans and routinely fought with the Tambuku and Buton polities.

Dutch East Indies and Indonesia
In 1907, Ternate ceded territories including Banggai to the Dutch East Indies, and the following year the king of Banggai signed a treaty with the Dutch putting the kingdom under Dutch control. Banggai's territories were administered through two Onderafdeling – the islands and the mainland.

After the independence of Indonesia, territories that comprised the Banggai kingdom was reorganized into the Central Sulawesi province, with an administrative reorganization in 1952 removing any legal powers of the kingdom. Today, the former territories of the kingdom are divided into the regencies of Banggai, Banggai Islands and Banggai Laut.

Government
Although the position is hereditary, the king of Banggai is ultimately appointed by the Sultan of Ternate, and acts as the polity's chief executive. The king is aided by four advisers, who also help in monitoring four autonomous local chiefs known as the basalo sangkap. As an example, the 1706 Dutch estimate noted that Banggai had a population of 1,450, with the king of Banggai only having 150 men and the rest under the 4 local chiefs.

Footnotes

Bibliography

Further reading
 

Former countries in Indonesian history
States and territories established in the 16th century
States and territories disestablished in the 20th century
Central Sulawesi